Yevheniy Ihorovych Serdyuk (born 24 April 1998), commonly known as Jeka, is a Ukrainian professional footballer who plays as a forward for Bulgarian club CSKA 1948 Sofia.

Career
Serdyuk spent 4 years of his career as a player in Portugal.

On 7 September 2021, he joined Cherno More Varna in Bulgaria. A year later Serdyuk signed with CSKA 1948.

Career statistics

Club
.

Notes

References

External links
Statistics at UAF website (in Ukrainian)

1998 births
Living people
People from Druzhkivka
Ukrainian footballers
Ukraine under-21 international footballers
Ukrainian expatriate footballers
Association football forwards
Campeonato de Portugal (league) players
Liga Portugal 2 players
First Professional Football League (Bulgaria) players
C.D. Fátima players
Boavista F.C. players
Casa Pia A.C. players
PFC Cherno More Varna players
Ukrainian expatriate sportspeople in Portugal
Expatriate footballers in Portugal
Ukrainian expatriate sportspeople in Bulgaria
Expatriate footballers in Bulgaria
Sportspeople from Donetsk Oblast